Theoni Pappas (born 1944) is an American mathematics teacher known for her books and calendars concerning popular mathematics.

Pappas is a graduate of the University of California, Berkeley, and earned a master's degree at Stanford University. She became a high school mathematics teacher in 1967.

She is the author of books including:
Mathematics Appreciation (1986)
The Joy of Mathematics (1986)
Greek Cooking for Everyone (with Elvira Monroe, 1989)
Math Talk: Mathematical Ideas in Poems for Two Voices (1991)
More Joy of Mathematics: Exploring Mathematics All around You (1991)
Fractals, Googols, and Other Mathematical Tales (1993)
The Magic of Mathematics: Discovering the Spell of Mathematics (1994)
The Music of Reason: Experience the Beauty of Mathematics through Quotations (1995)
Math for Kids & Other People Too! (1997)
The Adventures of Penrose: The Mathematical Cat (1997)
Mathematical Scandals (1997)
Math-a-Day: A Book of Days for Your Mathematical Year (1999)
Mathematical Footprints: Discovering Mathematical Impressions All around Us (1999)
Math Stuff (2002)
Further Adventures of Penrose the Mathematical Cat (2004)
Mathematical Snippets: Exploring Mathematical Ideas in Small Bites (2008)
Numbers and Other Math Ideas Come Alive (2012)
Do the Math! Math Challenges to Exercise Your Mind (2015)
More Math Adventures with Penrose the Mathematical Cat (2017)
Mathematical Journeys: Math Ideas and the Secrets They Hold (2021)

Additionally, she has written a series of annual mathematics calendars in various editions.

References

Further reading
Pappas is profiled in 

1944 births
Living people
University of California, Berkeley alumni
Stanford University alumni
20th-century American mathematicians
21st-century American mathematicians
American women mathematicians
Mathematics educators
20th-century American women
21st-century American women